Zhu Hongyang (born 11 February 1964) is a Chinese athlete. She competed in the women's javelin throw at the 1984 Summer Olympics.

References

1964 births
Living people
Athletes (track and field) at the 1984 Summer Olympics
Chinese female javelin throwers
Olympic athletes of China
Place of birth missing (living people)